This list of public administration scholars includes notable theorists, academics, and researchers from public administration, public policy, and related fields such as economics, political science, management, administrative law. All of the individuals in this list have made a notable contribution to the field of public administration.

 O. P. Dwivedi
 Graham T. Allison
 Paul Appleby
 Walter Bagehot
 Chester Barnard
 Reinhard Bendix
 James M. Buchanan
 Lynton K. Caldwell
 Michel Crozier
 Robert A. Dahl
 A.V. Dicey
 Anthony Downs
 Peter Drucker
 Patrick Dunleavy
 Dorman Bridgman Eaton
 David John Farmer
 Henri Fayol
 James W. Fesler
 Mary Parker Follett
 H. George Frederickson
 Louis C. Gawthrop
 Frank J. Goodnow
 Charles Goodsell
 Luther Gulick
 Friedrich Hayek
 Hugh Heclo
 E. Pendleton Herring
 Otto Hintze
 Marc Holzer
 Ralph P. Hummel
 Patricia Ingraham
 Barry Dean Karl
 V.O. Key, Jr.
 Gyula Koi
 Harold Laski
 Harold Lasswell
 Charles E. Lindblom
 Michael Lipsky
 Norton E. Long
 Theodore J. Lowi
 Niklas Luhmann
 James March
 Roscoe C. Martin
 Karl Marx
 Renate Mayntz
 Howard E. McCurdy
 Kenneth J. Meier
 Robert K. Merton
 Henry Mintzberg
 Mark H. Moore
 Frederick C. Mosher
 R. E. Neustadt
 Felix A. Nigro
 W. A. Niskanen
Rosemary O'Leary 
 Johan Olsen
 Elinor Ostrom
 Laurence O'Toole
 C. Northcote Parkinson
 James L. Perry
 Gerrit van Poelje
 Jack Rabin
 Hal G. Rainey
 Emmette Redford
 R. A. W. Rhodes
 Norma M. Riccucci
 John A. Rohr
 David H. Rosenbloom
 Philip James Rutledge
 S.N. Sadasivan
 Allen Schick
 Philip Selznick
 Patricia M. Shields
 Herbert A. Simon
 Theda Skocpol
 Stephen Skowronek
 Lorenz von Stein
 Richard J. Stillman II
 Camilla Stivers
 Joseph R. Strayer
 Frederick Winslow Taylor
 Alain Touraine
 Thomas Frederick Tout
 Paul P. Van Riper
 Dwight Waldo
 Gary Wamsley
 Kenneth F. Warren
 Max Weber
 Leonard D. White
 Aaron Wildavsky
 William F. Willoughby
 James Q. Wilson
 Woodrow Wilson
 Deil S. Wright
 Tuyammum Kabir
 Md Mosharraf Hossain

References

Public administration scholars
Public administration
.
Frank Persons Sherwood, a distinguished scholar and professor in the field of public administration and the founding director of the Federal Executive Institute in Charlottesville, Virginia, died on August 28, 2019 at his home in Annapolis, Maryland.In 1950, Dr. Sherwood received a Master’s of Science degree in Public Administration from the University of Southern California. In 1951, he began his academic career as an Assistant Professor in Public Administration, obtaining his Ph.D. in Political Science from USC shortly afterwards. He taught at USC until 1968, becoming the Director of the USC School of Public Administration. While at USC, he and his family lived in Rio de Janeiro, where he ran USC’s academic program in Brazil. He also taught USC courses in Pakistan and Iran.
In 1981, he accepted an appointment as the Chairman of the Department of Public Administration at Florida State University in Tallahassee. The University subsequently named him as the first Jerry Collins Eminent Scholar in Public Administration. He served as Management Advisor to the Honorable Robert Graham, Governor of Florida. He retired from FSU in 1995.
Dr. Sherwood received many awards during his academic and professional career, including the National Newswriting Champion in High Schools (1937), Rufus Choate Scholar (Dartmouth), Class of 1926 Fellow (Dartmouth), and election to Phi Beta Kappa, Pi Sigma Alpha. Most recently he received FEI’s First Honorary Service Award in 2018. In 1973-74, he served as National President of the American Society for Public Administration. He was elected Fellow of the National Academy of Public Administration in 1969 and chaired various NAPA committees during his career. He served on the Board of Editors for numerous publications, including Public Administration Review and the International Journal of Public Administration.